Aminul Haque (Bengali: আমিনুল হক; born 5 October 1980), is a former Bangladeshi professional footballer who played as a goalkeeper. He has been marked as the "Greatest Goalkeeper of All Time to have represented Bangladesh (and also arguably one of the Greatest Footballers of All Time in Bangladesh)". Former Coach of Bangladesh national football team George Kottan even went as far as to declare him as one of the best goalkeepers he has ever seen.

He is considered one of the great South Asian influential footballer along with Ali Ashfaq and Bhaichung Bhutia of his generation and his good ability to read the game and positional sense made him one of the "Greatest Goalkeeper in South Asian Football History. Shebby Singh of ESPN Star said, "he deserves to play in a better league. Maybe even in England with proper training."

Early life 
Aminul was born on October 5, 1980 in Bhola district but he spent his childhood live in Dhaka. they are three brothers. His two brothers are also played national League. In 1993, he played his first Pioneer League for MSPCC.

Club career
Aminul made his senior club debut with the Mohammedan team in 1994. Trying and failing to break in the starting eleven of Mohammedan, he ended up in Farashganj  where he made his first division debut 2 year later in 1996. In 1997 he joined Muktijoddha Sangsad for the first time and won the Premier Division League. But in his second term, he spent his golden days with Muktijoddha from 2000 to 2004. He was the captain of the team that won the domestic football double in 2003. Aminul also played 2002 Asian Club Championship for them. For next two seasons he played for Brothers Union, and then in 2008 he came to Mohammedan. In 2007, he missed an entire season due to injury. After his Bangladesh   national team retirement, he joined Sheikh Jamal DC in 2010. Aminul finished his professional career in 2013 from Mutkijoddha.

Although he spent most of his football career in Bangladesh, in 2004 he was contacted by Newcastle United of Premier League for recruitment. But unfortunately, the deal fell through. When asked about it, he said, "yes I did get an offer from Newcastle United, but because of some communication problem, the deal did not progressed."

International career
In 1995, he earned a call up to the Bangladesh national squad, but couldn't break into the starting eleven right away. Finally, in 1998, his dream came true as he started against Qatar in a friendly match. He won the Gold in 1999 SA Games and 2010 SA Games.
His most influential game was probably against Maldives in the finals of 2003 SAFF Championship Cup squad. The game went on to the penalty shoot out and Aminul Hoque stepped up like a true leader. A true shot stopper, he won Bangladesh the game that night with a few fine saves. Aminul was also nominated as the best goalkeeper in the 2003 SAFF games. Aminul later stated in an interview that he was not supposed to play the final due to a back pain. However, he was determined to help the team lift the title, and played the whole game on painkillers. He uninterruptedly captained the national side from 2005. Bangladeshi football fan cherish his extraordinary performance in SAFF 2005 final although Bangladesh were defeated 2–0 by India. In 2010, when he was at the peak of his career he decided to retire from national team and make way for young players to come in. His last game for the national team was against Hong Kong at the Asian Games in Guangzhou.

Since then, his longtime national teammate and rival Biplob Bhattacharya took his place as both the captain and goalkeeper of Bangladesh national football team. In 2011 Bangladesh Football Federation's appeal to reconsider his retirement decision to represent the country in the FIFA World Cup pre-qualifiers against Pakistan. He said,“I stick to my decision of retirement from the international arena as I discussed the issue with my family members and well-wishers after getting a comeback call from the BFF on Monday,”

Honours

Bangladesh
 SAFF Championship: 2003

References

1980 births
Living people
Bangladeshi footballers
Bangladesh international footballers
Association football goalkeepers
Mohammedan SC (Dhaka) players
Muktijoddha Sangsad KC players
Footballers at the 2010 Asian Games
People from Barisal
Footballers from Dhaka
Asian Games competitors for Bangladesh
Farashganj SC players